Daniel Anthony Bellino (born October 10, 1978) is an American umpire in Major League Baseball.

Education
Bellino was a catcher for his high school, Loyola Academy in Wilmette, Illinois. He attended Northern Illinois University and managed the men's basketball team under Head Coach Brian Hammel. During his studies at the NIU College of Business, Dan was selected and attended a semester at Oxford University in England. He  holds a J.D. from the University of Illinois at Chicago, an MBA from the Brennan School of Business, and has passed the Illinois bar exam.

Umpiring career
Bellino has umpired Major League Baseball games since the 2008 season. He was promoted to crew chief in 2023. 

On May 4, 2022, Bellino ejected Arizona Diamondbacks pitcher Madison Bumgarner from a game after the top of the first inning. Just before the ejection, Bumgarner appeared to have become frustrated after Bellino stared down the pitcher and held his hand for an abnormally long time during a foreign substance check. Bellino's conduct  seemed to stem from Bellino's unhappiness with Bumgarner in the prior half-inning. Two days later, Bellino issued a public apology and faced undisclosed discipline from the MLB.

Outside baseball
Bellino worked for the law firm of Morici, Figioli & Associates and served as an aide for federal judge Charles P. Kocoras before attending umpire school. Holding both Juris Doctor (JD) and MBA degrees, Bellino's terminal law school research paper concerned the major league umpire union and 1999 umpires' strike. In 2008, Dan and his father Tony acquired the RE/MAX Superior Properties office in Huntley, Illinois. Currently, he manages a suburban law firm and serves as "of counsel" for the international law firm Lowis & Gellen LLP based in Chicago, IL. Bellino also owns and manages Elite Extremity MRI of Wisconsin.

Personal life
He lives in Crystal Lake, Illinois, with his wife and their four children.  Dan's oldest son is named after his brother, who died unexpectedly during Dan's childhood.

See also 
 List of Major League Baseball umpires

References

External links

Major League profile
Retrosheet
Umpire Ejection Fantasy League profile

1978 births
Living people
Baseball people from Illinois
Major League Baseball umpires
People from Crystal Lake, Illinois
Sportspeople from Chicago
Northern Illinois University alumni